Husvik is a populated area located east of the city of Tønsberg, south of Klopp and Vallø in Norway.

Villages in Vestfold og Telemark